One Way Street may refer to:
one-way traffic
One Way Street (1925 film), a 1925 American drama film directed by John Francis Dillon
One Way Street, a 1950 American crime film directed by Hugo Fregonese
One Way Street (book), a 1928 anthology of brief meditations by Walter Benjamin
"One Way Street", song by Michael Learns to Rock from the album Blue Night
"One Way Street", song by Soup Dragons from the album Hydrophonic
"One Way Street", song by Aerosmith from the album Aerosmith
"One Way Street", song by Go West from the album Bangs & Crashes